Following is a list of chairmen of the Assembly of Experts of Iran, from the 1979 Iranian Revolution to present.

List of chairmen

See also 

 List of members in the First Term of the Council of Experts
 2020 List of members of the Council of Experts
 Assembly of Experts

References
 http://Majlis.ir
 http://www.irna.ir
 https://web.archive.org/web/20090917142643/http://green-and-free.blogfa.com/

Iran, List of Speakers of Assembly of Experts of
Main